Tricholoma luteomaculosum is a mushroom of the agaric genus Tricholoma. It was first formally described by American mycologist Alexander H. Smith in 1942.

See also
List of North American Tricholoma

References

External links
 

Fungi described in 1947
Fungi of North America
luteomaculosum